Jennifer Karnott (born 4 March 1995) is a German badminton player.

Achievements

BWF International Challenge/Series
Women's Doubles

Mixed Doubles

 BWF International Challenge tournament
 BWF International Series tournament
 BWF Future Series tournament

References

External links
 

1995 births
Living people
People from Düren
Sportspeople from Cologne (region)
German female badminton players
European Games competitors for Germany
Badminton players at the 2015 European Games